Abad Shahpur (also Romanized as Ābād Shāhpūr; also known as Ābād Shāpūr) is a village in Khafr Rural District, Khafr District, Khafr County, Fars Province, Iran. At the 2016 census, its population was 1,737, in 350 families.

References 

Populated places in  Jahrom County